Elle, lui et l'autre.... is the ninth studio album by Egyptian-French vocalist Dalida. It was released in 1960. It was her second released exclusively to the Canadian public.

History 
In the two years prior to the release, Dalida released twelve songs, among which are her international hits "T'aimer follement", "Romantica", "Itsi bitsi petit bikini", "O sole mio" and "Les enfants du Pirée".

The album yielded the successful song "Elle lui et l'autre", which topped Canadian charts, and "Bras dessus, bras dessous," which became the theme song of the eponymous Canadian TV show.

Track listing 
Elle, Lui Et L'Autre
T'aimer Follement
Dans Les Rues de Bahia
Tintarella de Luna
L'Arlequin de Tolède
Romantica
Itsy Bitsy
Comme Au Premier Jour
Ni Chaud, Ni Froid
O Sole Mio
Bras Dessus Bras Dessous
Les Enfants Du Pirée

See also 
 Dalida discography

References 

Dalida albums
1960 albums
French-language albums
Barclay (record label) albums